Rakibabad, sometimes written as Rakeebabad, is a village in Gosainganj block of Lucknow district, Uttar Pradesh, India. As of 2011, its population is 1,204, in 254 households. It is part of the gram panchayat of Sikandarpur Amauliya.

References 

Villages in Lucknow district